Nicodimas Sekheta Mogashoa (born  June 9, 1992), professionally known as  Da Capo, is a South African DJ and record producer. Born and raised in Seshego, Da Capo rose to prominence after remixing the single "Pretty Disaster" by Moneoa. He then signed a recording deal with Soulstic Music and his studio debut album Indigo Child (2017), which was certified double platinum by the Recording Industry of South Africa (RiSA).

Career 
Nicodimas Sekheta Mogashoa was born on August 14, 1992, Seshego township Zone 3, Polokwane, South Africa. After completed his matric, he studied for media and communication at University of Limpopo but dropped out. His musical career began as a rapper and later developed interest on house music.

After he signed a record deal with Soulstic Music, Indigo Child was released on December 8, 2017, in South Africa. It features GoodLuck, Berita, Wanda Baloyi, Jackie Queens, Renee Thompson, Soulsta, Miss Dippy, Tshepo King, and Darian Crouse. The album was certified  double platinum and garnered over  36.5 million streams on digitally streaming platforms.

He established independent record label Genesys Entity and released his EP Genesys in May 2020. "Moyo Wanagu" featuring BATUND was released  as EP's lead single.

"Light House" was released on September 3, 2021, by TRESOR featuring Da Capo and Sun-El Musician.

In the fourth quarter of 2021, he collaborated with Gallo to remix "Imbizo", which appeared on compilation album Music is Forever, released on December 17, 2021.

Artistry 
In an interview with The Playground, Da Capo said: his musical career was inspired by  Jimpster, Nick Holder, Quinton Harris.

Awards and nominations

Dance Music Awards 

!
|-
|2018
|Indigo Child
|Album of The Year
|
|
|-
|rowspan="2"|2019
|Himself 
|Best Producer
|
|rowspan="2"|
|-
|"Found You" featuring Berita
|Best Music Video
|

DJ Awards 

!
|-
| 2019
| Himself 
| Best Afro House Artist
| 
|

Limpopo Awards 

!
|-
| 2018
| "Found You"
| Best Dance/House Single
| 
|

South African Music Awards 

!
|-
| rowspan="2"|2021
| rowspan="2"| "Yehla Moya"
| Remix of the Year 
| 
|rowspan="2"|
|-
|Best Collaboration 
|
|-
|rowspan="2"|2022 
|"Uhuru" Sun-El Musician, Azana, and Da Capo
|rowspan="2"|Remix of the Year
| 
|rowspan="2"|
|-
|"Mama" 
|

Discography 
 Touch (2013)
 Indigo Child (2017)
 Genesys (2020)
 Return to the beginnings (2021)

References 

Living people
1992 births
South African DJs
South African record producers
People from Polokwane